Giles Cyril Patrick Mackay (born 1961/1962) is a British businessman and property investor.

Career
Mackay is a former barrister.

He founded Hometrack, a property market analytics company, in 1999 and appointed as its CEO.

As a real-estate and property management entrepreneur, he started the first of the Assettrust companies in 1987 and grew through the corporate property sale and leaseback market (high leverage). In 2002, he founded the Assettrust Companies, Assettrust Housing, a real-estate development company and according to Bloomberg delivered 624 shared ownership homes across the UK without the aid of a government grant.

In 2012, his net worth was "over £100 million".,

Company
Mackay's company, Hometrack Data Systems Limited, is headquartered in central London.  The company has grown quickly since its inception, with yearly growth reported by Fast Track at 72% since 2005.

The company is presently developing a product for the British credit-card market. In addition, their automated property valuation models are used throughout Europe and Australia including for publications such as Yahoo UK and The Guardian.

Although he remains chairman of Hometrack, Charles Bryant was appointed chief executive officer in 2013.

In 2017, it was announced that Mackay's company Hometrack was being sold to Zoopla for £120 million.

References

Living people
1962 births